KTIK (1350 kHz, "95.3 The Ticket") is a commercial AM radio station located in Boise, Idaho, United States. KTIK airs sports/talk programming as a CBS Sports Radio affiliate and is under ownership of Cumulus Media.

On January 26, 2011, KTIK began simulcasting on KZMG 93.1 FM, which was subsequently renamed KTIK-FM.

On January 3, 2022, KTIK rebranded as "95.3 The Ticket" after KTIK-FM switched to a simulcast of news/talk-formatted KBOI 670 AM.

Previous logo
 (KTIK's logo under previous simulcast with KTIK-FM 93.1)

References

External links

FCC History Cards for KTIK

TIK
Cumulus Media radio stations
Radio stations established in 1962
CBS Sports Radio stations
Sports radio stations in the United States